Labour CND (Lab CND) is a 'Specialist Section' of Campaign for Nuclear Disarmament, specifically relating to CND-supporting members the Labour Party.

History
Labour CND was established in 1979 and exists to this day. High-profile members of Labour CND include the former Leader of the Labour Party and Leader of the Opposition Jeremy Corbyn MP, former MPs Alice Mahon and until his death in 2019, Walter Wolfgang. Former Prime Minister Tony Blair and former Foreign Secretary Jack Straw were once members as young MPs.

External links

Labour CND Archive at University of Warwick

1979 establishments in the United Kingdom
1979 in politics
Campaign for Nuclear Disarmament
Organisations associated with the Labour Party (UK)